The 2018 FIA WTCR Race of Hungary was the second round of the 2018 World Touring Car Cup and the first running of the FIA WTCR Race of Hungary. It was held on 28 and 29 April 2018 at the Hungaroring in Mogyoród, Hungary. The first and third races were won by Gabriele Tarquini and the second won by Jean-Karl Vernay.

Entry list

A total of 25 cars were entered, along with two Hungarian wildcard entries; Attila Tassi and Daniel Nagy. The following teams and drivers were entered into the event:

Results

Qualifying 1

Race 1

Qualifying 2

Race 2

 Fabrizio Giovanardi originally finished nineteenth was given a 30-second time penalty.

Race 3

 Pepe Oriola originally finished twelfth but was given a 10-second time penalty.
 Mat'o Homola originally finished fifteenth but was given a 10-second time penalty.

Standings after the round
Drivers' Championship standings

Teams' Championship standings

References

External links
 

World Touring Car Cup
Hungary